Paisa Ya Pyar is a 1969 Indian Hindi-language film directed by Jawar N. Sitaraman. The film stars Ashok Kumar, Biswajeet, Mala Sinha, Tanuja and Shashikala. The lyrics were written by Sahir Ludhianvi. The film was a remake of the Tamil film Panama Pasama.

Cast
 Ashok Kumar as Mohanlal
 Biswajeet as Shekhar
 Mala Sinha as Shanti,Mohanlal Daughter 
 Tanuja as Dhanwanti "Dhanno"
 Shashikala as Laxmi
Gajanan Jagirdar as Shankarlal, Shekhar father
Sharad Kumar  as Deepak, Mohanlal Son

Music

References

1969 films
1960s Hindi-language films
Films scored by Ravi
Hindi remakes of Tamil films